Vice-Admiral George Clarence Jones,  (24 October 1895 – 8 February 1946) was a Royal Canadian Navy vice admiral who served as Chief of the Naval Staff from 15 January 1944 to 28 February 1946.

Career

Early career
Jones joined the Royal Canadian Navy in 1911 at the age of 15, entering the Royal Naval College of Canada (RNCC) in January. During the First World War Jones joined  in 1915 before performing his sub-lieutenant courses in 1916 at Portsmouth. On 1 December 1916, Jones was made sub-lieutenant in the Royal Canadian Navy. On 1 January 1917, Jones was made acting lieutenant. The position became permanent on 1 June that year. In 1917, Jones transferred to the depot ship . Jones became the first lieutenant of the destroyer  in 1917, serving with the ship until 1918.

Interwar years
Following the war, Lieutenant Jones returned to the RNCC from 1919 to 1920. In 1920, Jones was appointed to command the Canadian destroyer , the first member of the original RNCC class to achieve the position. It was during this period that the rivalry with Leonard W. Murray and R.I. Agnew began. Murray and Agnew used naval regulations to gain seniority on the Navy List, putting them closer to receiving commands than Jones. Agnew jumped over Jones in seniority. Walter Hose, the director of the Royal Canadian Navy at the time, sought to ease tensions among the three by giving Jones command of Patrician. However, he made Agnew Patricians first lieutenant in August 1921 and the results were poor. In 1922, Jones was made commanding officer of the destroyer . In 1924, Jones joined the battleship  and wrote a letter in August to Hose requesting increased seniority on the Navy List due to the fact that he was unable to specialize and climb the ranks. Not long after Jones was promoted to lieutenant commander effective 1 January 1925, while Agnew remained a lieutenant for a further two-and-a-half months. Murray remained senior to Jones.

In 1927, Jones was assigned to the battleship , followed by a stint aboard  in 1928. Jones was promoted to commander effective 1 January 1929 was made Senior Naval Officer Halifax at HMCS Stadacona in 1929. Jones remained in that position until 1932, when he became the commanding officer of the destroyer . In 1934, Walter Hose retired and Percy W. Nelles was made the commander of the Royal Canadian Navy. Under Hose, Murray had prospered and was made acting captain. Nelles preferred Jones as an officer, and his professional reviews of Jones were better than those he gave Murray. This was followed by a term as Director of Naval Operations and Training in 1936. On 1 August 1938, Jones was promoted to captain, while Murray was promoted a day later, making Jones senior to Murray.

Second World War
As Captain (D) of the Canadian Flotilla, Jones had control over the East Coast destroyer force during the opening months of the Second World War, commanding the destroyer . On 7 June 1940, he was made a commodore and made the commanding officer of Halifax Force from 1940. Jones transferred his flag ashore to HMCS Stadacona and was made Commanding Officer Atlantic Coast. This was the senior Canadian position on the East Coast. It was during this period that he earned the nickname "Jetty Jones", which came about during his stints in command of Ottawa and Assiniboine. The nickname was based on the idea that Jones' vessels remained in harbour more than other ships in the fleet. This was not the reality as Jones took his fair share of sailings, but did represent his growing unpopularity among the personnel of the Royal Canadian Navy. On 1 December 1941, Jones was made a rear admiral and continued to hold the Atlantic Coast command. Murray's appointment to rear admiral came a day later, maintaining Jones' seniority over Murray. In March 1942, Jones had a heart attack, making the only witness to the even swear secrecy so that Jones could continue his naval career.

Nelles liked Jones' ability to do staff work and got the permission from the Defence Minister, Angus L. MacDonald to bring him to Ottawa. Jones joined  in Ottawa at the Naval Service Headquarters as Vice Chief of the Naval Staff beginning on 9 October 1942 and as a member of the Naval Board. A hard worker, Jones began a campaign to undermine Nelles and eventually take over command of the Royal Canadian Navy. Jones was caught by Nelles discussing naval training issues with the defence minister behind his back. Jones formed a small group of officers at headquarters that called themselves "Jones men". One of them, Horatio Nelson Lay was the nephew of the Prime Minister, William Lyon Mackenzie King, and set about undermining the prime minister's confidence in Nelles. Facing both internal dissent and external pressure, MacDonald reassigned Nelles to oversee the Canadian naval component of the upcoming invasion of Europe. In 1943 and became Chief of the Naval Staff. Jones was caught off guard by the announcement of his promotion.

Upon assuming office, Jones drew up plans to dismiss and forcibly retire scores of former Royal Navy and Royal Canadian Naval Reserve officers in a purge. The dismissal of former Royal Navy officers was an effort by Jones to allow Canadian officers to prove themselves and to make the service more Canadian. It was also during his tenure that the issues that had plagued Nelles, such as fleet modernisation and training, were mostly resolved. On 9 May 1944, he was promoted to vice admiral. Jones then sought to transfer 70% of the Royal Canadian Navy fleet to the Pacific in tandem with the Royal Navy. Working with MacDonald and Lay, Jones received approval from the Cabinet. However, the British assumed Canada would send its fleet to help the Royal Navy recover lost colonies in the South Pacific, to which King wanted no part of. As King grew angry at the efforts by MacDonald and Jones' to keep their word to the British that Canada would join them in the South Pacific, the two shifted blame onto Nelles as the scapegoat. When Nelles came home to give an update, he learned he was to be forcibly retired in January 1945. Jones and MacDonald travelled to England and managed to get the aircraft carriers and destroyers that had been promised in trade for Canadian support in the South Pacific without going against King's wishes.

Jones' advocated further ties with the United States Navy, believing that the future lied in hemispheric defence. In April 1945, MacDonald left the National Defence post and was replaced by a new minister, Douglas Abbott. Shortly after assuming the post, the Halifax riot took place, when citizens and sailors rioted after drinking establishments were closed in Halifax for the VE-Day celebration. This led to the dismissal of Rear Admiral Murray, who was Commander-in-Chief Northwest Atlantic, whom Jones blamed for the situation. Jones assumed the title Commander-in-Chief Northwest Atlantic in his place. Jones initially left Harry DeWolf in charge in Ottawa as acting Chief of Naval Staff and focused his attention on the Northwest Atlantic. This led to instability in Ottawa, as DeWolf did not have enough authority and eventually Rear Admiral Cuthbert Taylor was put in place in Ottawa while Jones continued to focus on the Northwest Atlantic. Following the war's end, demobilisation efforts were restricted by the lack of direction from Ottawa, an issue that was not resolved until Jones' successor took over.

Jones died in office in 1946. The cause of death was ruled to be a massive heart attack caused by hypertension.

Awards and decorations
Jones's personal awards and decorations include the following:

x35px

126px

124px

126px

120px

Citations

References
 
 

1895 births
1946 deaths
Canadian admirals
Canadian Companions of the Order of the Bath
Royal Canadian Navy personnel of World War II
Commanders of the Royal Canadian Navy
Canadian military personnel from Nova Scotia